48 Hours a Day is a 2008 French comedy film directed by Catherine Castel. The film showed at the 2008 L'Alpe d'Huez Film Festival, and released on 4 June 2008 in France.

Plot 
Promised a brilliant professional future but tired to cap his career because she also has to care for her children, Marianne dreams of swapping roles with her husband Bruno so that he comes home earlier to take care of home and it can in turn devote more time to her job! From dream to reality, a humorous eye on the fate of women today who are constantly juggling job, children and home, often alone to bear everything.

Cast

References

External links 

2008 films
2008 comedy films
French comedy films
2000s French-language films
2000s French films